Wilhelm Jaich (born 6 August 1890, date of death unknown) was an Austrian equestrian. He competed in two events at the 1928 Summer Olympics.

References

1890 births
Year of death missing
Austrian male equestrians
Olympic equestrians of Austria
Equestrians at the 1928 Summer Olympics
Place of birth missing